The Divine Caste (in Spanish: la casta divina) or Fifty Kings of Henequen are terms used to refer to the members of the Yucatecan oligarchy that dominated the economy and politics of the region between the mid-19th century and the first half of the 20th century. This small, close-knit group of about twenty families of European descent (criollos) controlled the henequen industry, which transformed Yucatán into the richest and most industrialized state in Mexico at the beginning of the 20th century.

During Yucatan's Gilded Age, which lasted roughly between 1870 and 1920, henequen comprised almost twenty percent of Mexico's total exports, making it the second most important Mexican exportable product after Precious metals. In contrast to other Plantations in Latin America, Yucatecan entrepreneurs maintained control over the land, physical capital, and transport infrastructure. During the henequen boom, Mérida, the State capital, had more millionaires per capita than any other city in the world.

By the twentieth century, the divine caste had become a class divided against itself, effectively reflecting the power struggle between the traditional upper-class families that had dominated the Yucatán peninsula since colonial times and Olegario Molina who strived to monopolize the henequen industry, although he was only acting as an agent for the International Harvester, an American conglomerate. By the 1920s, because of the social upheaval caused by the Mexican Revolution, the divine castes lost a lot of their political influence. Nevertheless, descendants of the Yucatecan oligarchy continue to be active in business and are reputed to have been significant contributors to the foundation and development of the center-right National Action Party (PAN).

History 

Starting in the mid-nineteenth century, Eusebio Escalante Castillo, with financing from Thebaud Brothers, a New York City-based investment bank, had managed to develop the henequen industry in Yucatan, establishing it as a prosperous business for exporting raw materials to the industrialized countries of Western Europe and North America.

Following the example of Escalante, many of the traditional families of landowners, some of them descendants of the earliest Spanish conquistadores and colonists, managed to transform their Haciendas to concentrate solely on the production of henequen. Examples of these traditional upper-class families are the Peón and Cámara families who had been the most significant landowners in the region since colonial times.

Many families that had immigrated more recently from Europe to Yucatán also made significant profits from the henequen boom; in the first decade of the 20th century, it was claimed that the henequen industry produced more Millionaires per capita in Merida than anywhere else in the world. At the end of the 19th century, the henequen boom was accompanied by a boom in other Yucatecan primary goods: sugar, rubber, and chicle. While the extraction and exportation of these goods generated significant prosperity, this was concentrated in a small group of families, all of European descent (criollos), oftentimes with ties of kinship to each other. The members of this oligarchy received various nicknames from their critics, including the "fifty henequen kings" (John Kenneth Turner) or the "divine caste" (Alvarado). "Between 1880 and 1915 in the entity there were about 1,000 henequen haciendas, of which 850 had shredding and packing plants, in the hands of approximately 400 families. But a group of 20 or 30, which concentrated ownership of the land, was capable of extracting 50% of henequen, of controlling nearly 90% of its exportation, of directing, of course, the regional political destinies; in other words, it formed an oligarchy. Among its most prominent members were Eusebio Escalante Castillo, Eusebio Escalante Bates, Carlos Peón Machado, Pedro Peón Contreras, Leandro León Ayala, Raymundo Cámara Luján, José María Ponce Solís, Enrique Muñoz Arístegui, Olegario Molina Solís and Avelino Montes."

Carlos Peón, a liberal, served as Governor of Yucatán between 1894 and 1897 and was a firm believer of economic liberalism, promoting industry, particularly the production and export of henequen. His successors: Francisco Cantón (Conservative) and Olegario Molina (Liberal) continued to promote and participate in the henequen industry. 

Many of these industrialists, landowners and politicians became associated with elite Social clubs, such as "El Liceo", "La Unión", "Lonja Meridiana" or the Spanish Club of Mérida which excluded outsiders, even wealthy Lebanese businessmen (known as the "Berber Castes")"A group of Yucatecan merchants and landowners joined their interests and capital to form a similar society. Thus, taking advantage of the economic situation that Yucatan went through, a group of conservative industrialists was formed, including members of the regional Porfirian oligarchy such as Eusebio Escalante y Bates, Raymundo Cámara Luján and Agustín Vales Castillo, among others, who formed the so-called "Lonja Meridiana", a clique close to the newly elected governor, General Francisco Cantón."In 1902, just after the end of the Caste War, President Porfirio Díaz, using his political power, took the opportunity to reject the candidacy of Francisco Cantón (conservative) for the governorship of Yucatán, favoring Olegario Molina (liberal). That same year, despite protests from various sectors of the Yucatecan population, General Díaz ordered two acts which were detrimental to the region: the separation of Quintana Roo from Yucatecan territory and the renunciation of Mexican territorial claim over Belize. Forced to withdraw from public life, Francisco Cantón decided to withdraw from industry as well, selling his businesses to Eusebio Escalante.

The main competitor of the Escalante family was Olegario Molina, a businessman and politician who, despite having been born in poverty, had managed to amass a significant fortune under the protection of the federal government headed by President Díaz, a military dictator who ruled Mexico for three decades, and his closest advisors, a group of technocrats known as los Científicos. Olegario Molina served as Governor of Yucatán between 1902 and 1906 before joining the Cabinet of Mexico as Secretary of Commerce and Industry between 1906 and 1911.

After the Panic of 1907, the Escalante trading house all but collapsed and Molina was able to exploit the fall of his rival to consolidate himself as the main exporter of henequen, artificially depressing prices to corner the market. Molina used a mix of political influence, cronyism, and monopolistic business practices to consolidate his business empire and remove his rivals. Year later, it became known that Molina was just acting as an agent of the International Harvester Company, an American conglomerate. Nevertheless, after 1907, Olegario Molina quickly became the became the most conspicuous member of the Yucatecan oligarchy:

“Chief among the henequen kings of Yucatan is Olegario Molina, former governor of the state and Secretary of Commerce of Mexico. Molina’s holding and lands in Yucatán and Quintana Roo, cover more than 15,000,000 acres or 23,000 square miles – a small kingdom in itself. The fifty henequen kings live in costly palaces in Mérida and many of them have homes abroad. They travel a great deal, usually they speak several different languages and they and their families are a most cultivated class of people. All Merida and all Yucatan, even all the peninsula of Yucatan, are dependent on the fifty henequen kings. Naturally these men are in control of the political machinery of their state, and naturally they operated the machinery for their own benefit."

Given his preponderance in the economic and political life of the state, several landowners from the traditional families had to join forces to confront Molina's power, which threatened to monopolize the political and economic life of the state.

"In those years, the first association of henequen landowners appeared, their main purpose was to defend themselves against the group led by Olegario Molina and his son-in-law Avelino Montes. The obstacles they faced were major, because in addition to his economic power, Olegario Molina also had political power that he continued to exercise through his successor as Governor of Yucatán when he was appointed Secretary of Commerce [...] in Porfirio's cabinet Díaz in 1906. This caused a rift between the different associations of henequen landowners and the local and federal government authorities."

In 1910, Francisco I. Madero, a wealthy landowner from the northern state of Coahuila, led a democratic movement (known as Maderismo) to topple the Díaz dictatorship. His revolution counted with the support of many of the Yucatecan landowners who had been threatened by Olegario Molina.  "the relationship of these landowners with the government changed with the 1910 revolution headed by Francisco I. Madero and with the rise of José María Pino Suárez to the government of Yucatán in 1911... later, Governor Nicolás Cámara Vales would also emerge from this group." In 1911, José María Pino Suárez, a Maderista politician, was elected to the Governorship. His term was brief, however, because he resigned his post to serve as Vice-President of Mexico. His successor was his brother-in-law, Nicolás Cámara Vales. Both men were close to the traditional landowning families:“It must be remembered, by the way, that at that time the large landowners who had formed part of the old regime and supported the traditional (oligarchic) system, remained in force; their ties included the leaders of the local Maderismo, who maintained more moderate positions – one could even describe them as conservative – than in other states. In fact, Pino Suárez's wife, María Cámara Vales, was the daughter of a well-known landowning family with ample economic resources, which had maintained a close relationship with the old regime: Raymundo Cámara Luján and Carmen Vales Castillo. One of María's brothers (Nicolás) would serve as Governor of the state a year later.”The Maderista government of Nicolás Cámara Vales established the Henequen Market Regulatory Commission in 1912. This was an attempt to regulate prices and allow landowners greater access to the market, thus reducing the monopolistic power that the International Harvester wanted to amass through Molina. In February 1913, the Madero government was overthrown in a coup d'état that has since been known as the Ten Tragic Days. Faced with this situation, Governor Cámara Vales was forced to submit his resignation by the new military regime of General Victoriano Huerta. During the Huerta administration, despite being exiled in Cuba, Olegario Molina continued to dominate the politics and economy of his native state through figurehead Governors.

In 1915, when the Huerta regime collapsed, he was succeeded by Venustiano Carranza, a revolutionary politician who had once been a Maderista sympathizer but had grown exasperated by Madero's moderation. Soon after acceding to the presidency, Carranza sent General Salvador Alvarado to Mérida with the purpose of asserting the socialist ideals of the Mexican Revolution in the Yucatán peninsula.

Geographically isolated from the rest of the country, the Yucatán peninsula had managed to avoid the radicalism of the revolution. Both Molina and Pino Suárez had been liberals in the nineteenth century tradition who despised socialism. After the arrival of Alvarado in 1915, Yucatán could no longer avoid the wave of socialism that would dominate Mexican politics until the 1980s and the arrival of neoliberalism."Before the Revolution arrived in Yucatan, a small number of people had economic control or domination over the State in combination with foreign trusts. Their agent, Avelino Montes, a Spaniard, was the son-in-law and partner of Olegario Molina, the true master of the State, in collusion with a few large landowners. That group led by Montes dominated the government, the banks, the railroads, education, charity, the church, and even high-society parties. The one who did not belong to the CASTE was condemned to be excluded from everything. 'The leaves of the trees did not move' without the will of the CASTE. The Creels and Terrazas families were nothing but poor apprentices, who had to go to Yucatan to receive lessons... In exchange for the unconditional support and the money they offered to all governments, the landowners only demanded the protection and intervention of the authorities. to conserve the odious servitude of the Yucatan haciendas... REACTIONARIES, PRIVILEGED CASTE and DIVINE CASTE (Salvador Alvarado used capital letters to refer to that group throughout the quoted text) were the epithets that the Sinaloan General applied to the members of the tight henequen elite that controlled Yucatecan society, whose destruction had become a strategic objective for the constitutionalist General."

 General Alvarado tried to end the domination of the divine caste not only politically and economically but even socially. Some of the clubs that where associated with old the Yucatecan plutocracy included "El Liceo", "La Unión", "Lonja Meridiana" or the Spanish Club of Mérida: “Which brought together the cream of Merida's society… and were distinguished by the luxury and ostentation of their activities. In the exclusive venue of La Lonja Meridana, to which only members and guests had access, all of them white (criollo), while the ordinary mestizo people looked on from the street […] Thus, one night in March 1916, in the resplendent halls of La Lonja, Quadrilles, Waltzes, Mazurkas, dances and danzones were heard, as always. However, this time the espadrilles of the mestizos resounded on the marble floors, and the French mirrors reflected not the furs, dresses, and jewelry bought in Paris, but the filigree suits and rosaries of the mestizas. With what satisfaction General Alvarado must have contemplated that metaphor of the triumph of the mestizo people over the oligarchy. With how much horror the members of the Lonja Meridiana must have seen that unequivocal sign of the new times."
During the 1930s, President Cárdenas, a socialist, ordered the expropriation of the Haciendas of Yucatán effectively ending the remaining stranglehold that the divine caste still had over the region. After the Mexican Revolution, the descendants of the divine caste retired for the most part from frontline politics but continued to participate discretely in other areas of public life, such as business or diplomacy. Similarly, to the industrialists in Monterrey, the descendants of the Yucatecan oligarchy are believed to have contributed to the foundation and development of the center-right National Action Party (PAN). In 2001, after almost nine decades of Revolutionary governments, dating back to General Alvarado, Patricio Patrón Laviada, a PAN politician, ascended to the Governorship of Yucatán. It has been pointed out that Governor Patrón is the descendant of two families (Patrón and Laviada) that were closely associated with the oligarchy: "his arrival to power symbolized the return of the Yucatecan aristocracy or divine caste to power." The same is true of Carlos Castillo Peraza, the Yucatecan intellectual, responsible for developing much of the PAN party doctrine.

In popular culture 

The Divine Caste  is a 1977 Mexican historical drama film directed by Julián Pastor and starring Ignacio López Tarso, Ana Luisa Peluffo and Pedro Armendáriz Jr. The film is set in Yucatán around the time of the Mexican Revolution and portrays the social upheaval following General Salvador Alvarado's arrival in the area.

In Mexico, the term divine caste is commonly used even when referring to other élites, not limited to the Yucatecan oligarchy. Carlos Elizondo, for example, refers to the following example:"Relations with business leaders were very coarse. In general, President De la Madrid did not trust them. In his Memoires, he wrote: ‘Mexican capitalists are incredibly egoistical, incredibly stupid, and incredibly ignorant. Their attitudes are really incomprehensible at times. Now that I have to work with business leaders, I see their haughtiness and insolence. The see themselves as a divine caste, a privileged elite that are above the country’s problems.’”

References 

History of Mexico
History of the Yucatán Peninsula